Döröske is a village in Vas County, Hungary.

Location

Döröske is situated 12 kilometers East of Körmend, near to highway No. 8. Molnaszecsőd lies 4 kilometers from the village. The neighbouring villages are Molnaszecsőd, Magyarszecsőd, Döbörhegy, and Szarvaskend.

History
The village is mentioned in a charter from 1244, in which the old church of the village, which can now be found in the cemetery, is described. 
The second charter mentions that the landowner of the village is Monkus Miklós, who took the land for 5 years from the son of Marcellus of Saar.
In the 19th century the village had a population of between 300 and 400. In the 20th century it grew to almost 500 before declining again to the current level.

Features
The Roman Catholic Church was built in the 13th century in Romanesque style. The church is dedicated to Saint Jacob apostle, the junior. The church stands in the cemetery. It was renovated in recent years.

The old fortress stands at the Fő út 6 house garden. It was a fortified tower in the Árpád age.

External links
 Döröske on the homepage Vendégváró
 Döröske fortress images

References
Kereszturiné Pintér Mária (1987): Döröske monográfiája. (Monography of Döröske).

Populated places in Vas County
Romanesque architecture in Hungary